Astrochelys is a genus of tortoises in the family Testudinidae. The two species are both found in Madagascar, and both classified as critically endangered on the IUCN Red List.

Species

References

Bibliography

 
Turtles of Africa
Reptiles of Madagascar
Endemic fauna of Madagascar
Turtle genera
Taxa named by John Edward Gray